Lynne Miller (born 27 April 1951) is a British actress. Her first TV role was in 1974, but she is best known for the role of Cathy Marshall in The Bill, a TV series she appeared in from 1989 to 1996. Since that time she has appeared mostly on stage. She is married to photographer Nobby Clark.

In 2021, Miller recorded an Audio Commentary for an episode of The Bill called "Forget-Me-Not", alongside writer Russell Lewis, released on The Bill Podcast Patreon Channel, sharing her memories of the series.

Filmography
{| class="wikitable"
|-
! Year
! Title
! Role
! Notes
|-
|1974|| Haunted: Poor Girl || Florence Chasty || TV movie
|-
|1974|| Billy Liar (TV series) || Maureen || Episode: "Billy and the Alter Ego"
|-
|1975|| Thriller || || TV Series, Episode: "Murder Motel"
|-
|1979|| Hazell and the Public Enemy’’ || Rita ||
|-
|1982|| Who Dares Wins || Melissa ||
|-
|1984|| Travelling Man || Chrissie || TV Series, Episode: "First Leg"
|-
|1989–1996|| The Bill || W.P.C. Cathy Marshall || TV Series, 346 epsidoes
|-
|1998|| The Tribe || Judith ||
|}

Theatre
 Ivy & Joan (2014)
 Not Waving Pillion Funny Peculiar Tartuff Miracle The Usual Table (2002)
 The Good Hope Steaming (1997)<ref>[http://www.londontheatrearchive.co.uk/archive/secure/archivereviews/steaming97.htm Steaming at London Theatre Archives]</ref>
 The Artful Widow
 Scribes
 City Sugar (1975)
 Hitting Town

References

External links 
 

1951 births
Living people
British television actresses
Place of birth missing (living people)